Du Wei (born 9 February 1982) is a Chinese footballer.

He represented the Chinese national team in their participation in the 2002 FIFA World Cup. This saw foreign interests come from Scottish Premier League side Celtic in the form of a loan, however an extension to the loan was never taken up and he returned to Shanghai Shenhua where he captained them for several seasons before joining Hangzhou Greentown and Shandong Luneng as well as captaining his national team in the 2011 AFC Asian Cup.

Club career
Du Wei started his football career in 2000 playing for third-tier side Shanghai 02 where he was able to play at centre back or defensive midfield before the club were taken over by top-tier side Shanghai Shenhua in 2002. At Shanghai, he immediately commanded a regular position within the team and by his second season with them he won the last Chinese Jia-A League league title in 2003 before it was renamed as the Chinese Super League; however, the Chinese Football Association later revoked the title in 2013 after it was discovered the team's general manager Lou Shifang had bribed officials to be biased towards Shanghai in certain matches that season.

Du missed much of the season through injury and the team missed his services, finishing tenth within the league. When he returned from injury, his impressive displays for Shenhua saw Scottish Premier League side Celtic interested in him and his agent Edmund Chu oversaw his move to the club during the 2005–06 season, on a six-month short-term contract, which was hoped to lead to a long-term contract. At Celtic, he made several appearances on the bench before he finally made his debut in the Scottish Cup third round tie against Clyde on 9 January 2006 in a shock 2–1 defeat. His uninspiring first team debut saw him substituted at half time by Celtic manager Gordon Strachan. After that display, he was dropped from the team and his loan was cut short with him returning to Shanghai.

Returning to Shanghai, Du continued to command a regular starting place within the team and eventually became the team's captain by the 2008 league season, however after a disappointing 2009 campaign where the club finished in fifth place, the club were willing to listen for offers on him. After a protracted transfer period, he joined top-tier side Hangzhou Greentown on 10 March 2010 where he continued wearing the shirt number 5 for the following season. He was also named as the club's captain and was partnered with his previous teammate Ng Wai Chiu. He helped guide the club to their best ever league position of fourth and a chance to play in the AFC Champions League for the first time. Leading Hangzhou to their first ever AFC Champions League campaign, he played in five games as they were knocked out in the group stages; however, this was to prove to be the highlight of his career with them as the club couldn't improve upon their previous season league campaign and finished in eighth.

On 3 July 2012, Du was allowed to transfer to fellow top-tier side Shandong Luneng. On 7 July 2012, he was immediately placed within the team and made his debut for the club in a 3–1 win against Guizhou Renhe where he also scored his first goal for the club.

On 15 February 2015, he signed a two-year contract with China League One side Hebei China Fortune.

On 27 June 2017, he joined Guizhou Hengfeng Zhicheng on loan. He made a permanent transfer to Guizhou Hengfeng on 26 February 2018.

International career
Du captained the Chinese under-20 national team and lead them into the 2001 FIFA World Youth Championship in Argentina where they were knocked out in the last sixteen by Argentina. His performance within the tournament saw him win the Asian Young Footballer of the Year award and he then rapidly rose through the Chinese youth teams to graduate into the senior Chinese national football team when he made his debut against Trinidad and Tobago in a friendly on 5 August 2001 in a game that China won 3–0. This led to several further games and despite his lack of experience he was called up into the squad that played at the 2002 FIFA World Cup. Due to injury, he was dropped from the national team in the 2004 AFC Asian Cup that reached the final where Arie Haan preferred to play Zheng Zhi in defence. Du was able to regain his position within the national team after the tournament and was recalled for the 2007 AFC Asian Cup squad. When Gao Hongbo became the new manager of the national team, he chose Du as his captain and he led China to win the 2010 East Asian Football Championship.

Career statistics

Club statistics
Statistics accurate as of match played 11 November 2018.

1Other tournaments include Chinese FA Super Cup and A3 Champions Cup.

International goals

Honours

Club 
Shanghai Shenhua
 A3 Champions Cup: 2007

Shandong Luneng
Chinese FA Cup: 2014

Individual 
Chinese Super League Team of the Year: 2012

References

External links
 
 2002 China Team Player Profile at BBC website
 
 
 Player stats at sohu.com
 Player stats at football-lineups website
 

1982 births
Living people
People from Zhengzhou
Chinese footballers
Footballers from Henan
China international footballers
Chinese expatriate footballers
Association football central defenders
Shanghai Shenhua F.C. players
Celtic F.C. players
Zhejiang Professional F.C. players
Shandong Taishan F.C. players
Hebei F.C. players
Guizhou F.C. players
2002 FIFA World Cup players
2007 AFC Asian Cup players
2011 AFC Asian Cup players
Expatriate footballers in Scotland
Chinese expatriate sportspeople in Scotland
Asian Young Footballer of the Year winners
Chinese Super League players
China League One players
Footballers at the 2002 Asian Games
Asian Games competitors for China